My Own Best Enemy is the seventh studio album by soft rock singer-songwriter Richard Marx. The album hit No. 126 on the Billboard album chart in 2004. The album produced two singles, "When You're Gone" and "Ready to Fly." Both of them reached the 'Hot Adult Top 40' chart. "Ready To Fly" also hit No. 22 on the adult contemporary chart.

The album marked a return to the microphone for Marx, who had spent the early-2000s as a successful songwriter and producer, after the comparatively weak commercial reception of his last album in 2000.

, the album had sold a total of 56,958 copies in America per Nielsen SoundScan.

Track listing
All songs written by Richard Marx, except "Suspicion" co-written by Fee Waybill.
 "Nothing Left to Say" – 3:57
 "When You're Gone" – 4:24
 "One Thing Left" – 3:55
 "Loves Goes On" – 3:35
 "Ready to Fly" – 4:39
 "Again" – 6:17
 "Colder" – 3:09
 "Everything Good" – 3:18
 "The Other Side" – 4:56
 "Someone Special" – 4:15
 "Suspicion" – 3:56
 "Falling" – 5:13

Bonus tracks on Japanese release
• "Endless Summer Nights (Live version)" – 4:30

Bonus tracks on U.S. Target exclusive release 7243 4 73450 2 9
 "Should've Known Better" (Acoustic) – 3:46
 "Don't Mean Nothing" (Acoustic) – 3:57
 "When You're Gone" (Acoustic) – 3:44
 "Hazard" (Acoustic) – 4:10
 "Endless Summer Nights" (Live performance) – 4:25

Personnel 
 Richard Marx – arrangements, lead vocals, backing vocals (1, 4–6, 8, 10, 11), acoustic guitar (1–3, 5–7, 9, 11, 12), additional electric guitar (5), acoustic piano (5), string arrangements (5, 9, 12), electric guitar (8, 10, 11), keyboards (8, 9), synth bass (9)
 David Cole – virtual synthesizer (2, 6), synthesizers (7, 11), string arrangements (9), keyboard pad (12)
 Gary Smith – Hammond B3 organ (2, 4), keyboards (10)
 J. T. Corenflos – electric guitar (1, 3, 10, 12), guitars (2)
 Keith Urban – guitars (2), guitar solo (2), backing vocals (2), additional guitar (3)
 Michael Landau – guitars (4, 7), additional electric guitar (5), electric guitar (8), guitar solo (8)
 Michael Thompson – acoustic guitar (5), electric guitar (5, 9), guitars (6)
 Shane Fontayne – guitars (6), electric guitar (8, 11)
 Bruce Gaitsch – acoustic guitar (10)
 Paul Franklin – steel guitar (10)
 Glenn Worf – bass (1–3, 10, 12)
 Lance Morrison – bass (4, 7)
 Mark Browne – bass (6, 8, 11)
 Steve Brewster – drums (1–3, 5, 10, 12)
 Matt Laug – drums (4, 7)
 John Blasucci – drum programming (5)
 Greg Bissonette – drums (6, 8, 11)
 Matt Walker – drums (9)
 Eric Darken – percussion (4, 9)
 Stephen Balderston – cello (3, 8)
 Cliff Colnot – cello orchestration (3)
 Arif Mardin – string arrangements (5)
 Jessica Andrews – backing vocals (4)

The Amazing Nashville String Players
Cello
 Anthony LaMarchina
 Carol Rabinowitz
 Sari Reist
Violin
 David Angell
 David Davidson
 Connie Ellisor
 Gerald Greer
 Connie Heard
 Pam Sixfin
 Chris Teal
 Kathy Umstead
 Mary Kathryn Vanosdale
Viola
 Jim Grosjean
 Gary Vanosdale
 Kris Wilkinson (also string contractor)

Production 
 Producers – David Cole and Richard Marx
 Recorded and Mixed by David Cole
 Additional Engineering – Matt Prock
 Art Direction and Design – Beth Middleworth
 Creative Director – Gordon H. Lee
 Cover Photo – Paul Elledge
 Other Photos – Clay Patrick McBride
 Management – Wayne Issak and Karen Scott for Issak Entertainment.

Charts
Singles

References

2004 albums
Albums produced by Richard Marx
Manhattan Records albums
Richard Marx albums